Digital Reality Software Kft. (formerly Amnesty Design) was a Hungarian video game developer based in Budapest, Hungary. It was founded in 1991 as Amnesty Design, and started to work on their upcoming title, Reunion, which would be released in 1994 by Grandslam Video, for Amiga and MS-DOS. In 1997, leading up to the release of Imperium Galactica, the company changed its name to Digital Reality. In the following decade, games like Haegemonia: Legions of Iron, Platoon, SkyDrift and Desert Rats vs. Afrika Korps were produced, all to positive reception.

In 2006, Digital Reality opened a subsidiary studio, Whiz Software, in cooperation with CDV Software, and in 2011, they spun off a digital distribution subsidiary, Digital Reality Publishing. Digital Reality silently shut down in 2013. In February 2016, Austrian publisher Nordic Games acquired a range of intellectual properties formerly under the Digital Reality banner, withunder also Black Knight Sword, Imperium Galactica and Sine Mora.

Games developed

References 

Defunct video game companies of Hungary
Video game companies established in 1991
Video game companies disestablished in 2013
Video game development companies
1991 establishments in Hungary